Badanganj is a village in the Goghat II CD block  in the Arambagh subdivision of Hooghly district in the Indian state of West Bengal.

Geography

Area overview
The Arambagh subdivision, presented in the map alongside, is divided into two physiographic parts – the Dwarakeswar River being the dividing line. The western part is upland and rocky – it is extension of the terrain of neighbouring Bankura district. The eastern part is flat alluvial plain area.  The railways, the roads and flood-control measures have had an impact on the area. The area is overwhelmingly rural with 94.77% of the population living in rural areas and 5.23% of the population living in urban areas.

Note: The map alongside presents some of the notable locations in the subdivision. All places marked in the map are linked in the larger full screen map.

Location
Badanganj is located at

Demographics
As per the 2011 Census of India, Badanganj had a total population of 3,865 of which 1,957 (51%) were males and 1,908 (49%) were females. Population in the age range 0–6 years was 415. The total number of literate persons in Badanganj was 2,913 (84.43% of the population over 6 years).

Culture
David J. McCutchion mentions:
The Damodara temple as a West Bengal nava ratna with ridged turrets, with terracotta façade, built in 1810, measuring 16’ 6" square.
The Sridhara Laljiu as a double-storied flat roofed, with terracotta designs, built in 1802, measuring 18’ 7" x 17’ 11".

Badanganj picture gallery

Healthcare
There is a Primary Health Centre at Badanganj, with 2 beds.

References

External links

Villages in Hooghly district